Jordan Sebastian Waller (born 1992) is a British actor and writer, known for playing Lord Alfred Paget in the television series Victoria.

Early life and education 
Waller was born in Bristol and raised by three lesbian parents: his birth mother, Miranda, her partner at the time of his birth, Dawn, and her next partner, Jayne. It is a subject he has talked and written about extensively. As he was conceived via sperm donation, he has also promoted the need for more men to become sperm donors and is currently pursuing becoming a sperm donor himself.

He was educated at Bristol Grammar School, an independent day school, following which he studied French at Oxford University. He was a member of the Oxford University Dramatic Society (OUDS) where he appeared in The Picture of Dorian Grey, Betrayal, Dead Funny, Much Ado About Nothing and Twelfth Night.

Career 
In 2019 Waller released Two Heads Creek, a horror comedy in which he wrote and starred. It was also released in the UK in early 2020. He also wrote "Off the Rails" for Bill Kenwright which stars Judi Dench, Kelly Preston, Sally Phillips and Jenny Seagrove and was also due to be released in 2020.

In February 2019 he premiered his one-man show "the D Word" at the Vault Festival about his unconventional upbringing as the sperm donor child of lesbian parents, the death of one of his mothers and his search for his biological father. The D Word changed to Son of Dyke for its showing at the Edinburgh festival that same year.

Personal life 
Waller is openly gay.

Filmography

Films

Television

References

External links
Jordan Waller on IMDB

1992 births
21st-century English male actors
English male film actors
English male stage actors
English gay actors
Living people
Male actors from Bristol
People educated at Bristol Grammar School
Alumni of Wadham College, Oxford
Donor conceived people